Gabriel Ramon Estaba García (born 24 March 1965 in Carúpano, Sucre) is a Venezuelan basketball player. Estaba played Venezuela's Liga Profesional de Baloncesto with Panteras de Lara, Panteras de Miranda and Marinos de Oriente. He played with the Venezuela national basketball team at the 1990 FIBA World Championship (12th place) and 1992 Summer Olympics (11th place).

References

1965 births
Living people
Askatuak SBT players
Basketball players at the 1992 Summer Olympics
Gaiteros del Zulia players
Guaros de Lara (basketball) players
Liga ACB players
Marinos B.B.C. players
Olympic basketball players of Venezuela
Panteras de Miranda players
People from Carúpano
Small forwards
Venezuelan expatriate basketball people in the Dominican Republic
Venezuelan expatriate basketball people in Portugal
Venezuelan expatriate basketball people in Puerto Rico
Venezuelan expatriate basketball people in Spain
Venezuelan expatriate basketball people in the United States
Venezuelan men's basketball players
1990 FIBA World Championship players